Gilje is a surname. Notable people with the surname include:

Arne Gilje (born 1956), Norwegian rower
HC Gilje (born 1969), Norwegian artist
Kathleen Gilje (born 1945), American art restorer and artist
Rein Gilje (born 1959), Norwegian sprint canoer

Norwegian-language surnames